Jim Barrows (born 25 April 1944) is an American former alpine skier who competed in the 1968 Winter Olympics. Now teaching Ski History at Colorado Mountain College in Steamboat Springs

External links
 sports-reference.com

1944 births
Living people
American male alpine skiers
Olympic alpine skiers of the United States
Alpine skiers at the 1968 Winter Olympics
Colorado Buffaloes athletes
Sportspeople from Los Angeles
People from Steamboat Springs, Colorado